The  was an army of the Imperial Japanese Army based in Manchukuo as a garrison force under the overall command of the Kwantung Army during World War II, but its history dates to the Russo-Japanese War.

History
The Japanese 3rd Army was initially raised during the Russo-Japanese War under the command of General Nogi Maresuke. In the initial stages of the war, its primary mission was the Siege of Port Arthur. After the fall of that Russian stronghold, it was transferred north, where it played a crucial role in the subsequent Japanese drive towards Mukden in the closing stages of the war. It was disbanded at the end of the war.

The Japanese 3rd Army was raised again on January 13, 1938 in Manchukuo as a garrison force to guard the eastern borders against possible incursions by the Soviet Red Army. It afterwards came under the command of the Japanese First Area Army in July 1942. As the war situation deteriorated for the Japanese in southeast Asia, the more experienced units and much of the equipment of the IJA 3rd Army were transferred to other units.

During the Soviet invasion of Manchuria, its poorly trained and under-equipped forces were no match for the experienced battle-hardened Soviet Army, and it was forced back from various locations in Kirin province to the Korean border, surrendering at the end of the war in Yanji and Hunchun, in what is now part of the  Yanbian Korean Autonomous Prefecture of northeast China.

List of commanders

Commanding officer

Chief of Staff

References

External links
Lt. Col. David Glantz, August Storm: The Soviet 1945 Strategic Offensive in Manchuria, Leavenworth Paper No.7, Command and General Staff College, February 1983.
   Kwantung Army Order of Battle 30 July 1945

03
Military units and formations established in 1904
Military units and formations disestablished in 1945